Dylan John Tait (born 1 October 2001) is a Scottish professional footballer who plays as a midfielder for Arbroath, on loan from Hibernian.

Tait started his career with Raith Rovers, having first signed a senior contract in 2019. Hibernian signed him in August 2021 then loaned him back to Raith as part of the deal. He then spent the second half of that season on loan with Kilmarnock and was loaned to Arbroath in September 2022.

Club career

Raith Rovers 
Tait made his debut for Raith Rovers on the final matchday of the 2018–19 League One campaign, coming on as a late substitute in a 1–1 draw with Montrose. Tait made a further 13 appearances in the 2019–20 season, scoring 3 goals as Raith Rovers were promoted to the Scottish Championship. Tait started as Raith Rovers began their 2020–21 Championship season with a 3–0 win over Arbroath providing the assist for his side's second goal.

Hibernian

Hibernian signed Tait in August 2021 for an undisclosed fee, and loaned him back to Raith Rovers until January 2022 as part of the deal. On 20 January 2022, Tait joined Scottish Championship side Kilmarnock on loan for the remainder of the 2021–22 season.

Tait was loaned to Arbroath in September 2022.

Career statistics

References 

Scottish footballers
2001 births
Living people
Raith Rovers F.C. players
Scottish Professional Football League players
Association football midfielders
Footballers from Glasgow
Hibernian F.C. players
Kilmarnock F.C. players
Arbroath F.C. players